Derin Phillips, better known as DJ Caise (pronounced as "Case"), is a Nigerian disc jockey.

Life and music career

DJ Caise was born to the family of Mr & Mrs Phillips. His maternal grandfather, the late Chief Antonio Deinde Fernandez, was a Nigerian business magnate, diplomat and Permanent Representative of Central African Republic to the United Nations. Chief Fernandez' daughter, his mum Chief (Mrs) Teju Phillips, is a former commissioner of Lagos State.

DJ Caise interest in music started during his time at University of Reading.

DJ Caise was on "BBC Radio 1Xtra" with "Mista Silva", "C4 Pedro" & "pt:Big Nelo.

Record Deal: Chocolate City
DJ Caise got signed to Chocolate City in 2011.

OAP: The Beat 99.9 FM
DJ Caise is best known for hosting DJ Caise In The Mix, which is held every friday night from 9pm to 7am on The Beat 99.9 FM.

Education
He attended the University of Reading in "Reading, where he studied Finance. He also acquired his master's degree in Finance, as well as a bachelor's degree in Economics.

Music
He was trained at Point Blank Music College in Hoxton, North London, Los Angeles.

2015 - 16

Album
On November 30, 2015, DJ Caise announced the release of his debut album to be out in May 2016.

Tours

Hennessy artist club tour
In 2011, the Hennessy artiste club tour took off with the likes of Praiz, DJ Caise, DJ Spinall, Slyde, Bizzle, and Sammy.

Magazine

Blanck Magazine
In August 2016, DJ Caise was featured in Blanck Magazine.

Notable performances
He has performed in several popular events and shows since he rise to stardom, performed in events like:

Discography

Singles
 "Shake Bodi remix" (ft. Eldee, Jesse Jagz & Grip Boiz)" (2011)
 "Number One" (feat. Waje) (2012)
 "Buckle Up" (feat. Emmy Ace) (2014)
 "Crush" (feat. Ice Prince) (2014)
 " Psycho Music" (feat. Uzi) (2014)
 "Lights" (feat. Ice Prince) (2015)

Mixtapes

Compilation albums
 The Indestructible Choc Boi Nation with  Chocolate City (2015)

Awards and nominations

See also 
List of Nigerian DJs

References

External links
 DJ Caise

Living people
Nigerian radio presenters
Nigerian hip hop DJs
Nigerian record producers
Year of birth missing (living people)
Yoruba musicians
Yoruba radio personalities
Alumni of the University of Reading
Fernandez family (Lagos)